Baan Hollanda was a Dutch village in Thailand built during the Ayutthaya era in 1634. Baan Hollanda was located on the Chao Phraya River close to the Tambon Suan Phlu shipyard in Phra Nakhon Si Ayutthaya District, Phra Nakhon Si Ayutthaya Province, Thailand. Presently Baan Hollanda is being rebuilt on the original land with the intent of becoming an information centre and museum.

The term "Wilanda" was used by the Siamese in the past to mean those from the Netherlands, or the Dutch. It was derived from the Malay "Orang Belanda", used to denote the Dutch in Java and elsewhere in the East Indies. "Belanda" itself was possibly derived from the Portuguese "Hollanda" (Holland).

The Dutch first established formal trade relations with Siam in 1604, towards the end of King Naresuan’s reign. In 1608, King Ekathotsarot granted permission to the Dutch East India Company (VOC) to open its trading post in Ayutthaya. The location was in the southern part of the walled island city and was a rather constricted space. Thus in 1634, during the reign of King Prasat Thong, a new VOC factory and trading office was built on land bestowed by the Siamese King as reward for Dutch naval aid in Ayutthaya's war against Pattani. This new more commodious piece of land was situated next to the Chao Phraya River outside the walled city. Here goods could be loaded and unloaded much more conveniently than before.

In 2004, on the occasion of the 400th anniversary of relations between Thailand and the Netherlands, Queen Beatrix of the Netherlands, accompanied by Prince Willem-Alexander, Prince of Orange and Princess Maha Chakri Sirindhorn, visited the site of the Dutch settlement in Ayutthaya where the Fine Arts Department had been excavating the remains of the VOC lodge. Her Majesty graciously donated a sum of money towards the construction of an information centre, with a permanent exhibition, which may be considered a memorial of the long relations between the two countries.

See also 
 Netherlands–Thailand relations
 Nanban trade
 List of Jesuit sites
 Nagasaki foreign settlement
 Dejima, former Dutch quarter at the port of Nagasaki, Japan
 Thirteen Factories, a former area of Guangzhou, China, where the first foreign trade was allowed in the 18th century since the hai jin (海禁) ban on maritime activities.

References

External links
 Baan Hollanda Foundation

Tourist attractions in Phra Nakhon Si Ayutthaya province
History museums in Thailand
Former populated places in Thailand
Populated places established by the Dutch East India Company
Buildings and structures on the Chao Phraya River